SS Potsdam was an ocean liner completed in 1900 by the Blohm + Voss shipyard in Hamburg, Germany for the Holland America Line (HAL) for transatlantic service from Rotterdam to New York. She was the largest ship operated by HAL at the time.

In 1915 the ship was sold to the newly founded Swedish American Line and renamed SS Stockholm for transatlantic service from Gothenburg to New York. In 1929 she was sold to Norwegian interests and converted to the whale factory ship SS Solglimt. Following the German invasion of Norway in 1940 Solglimt was captured by the Kriegsmarine, transferred to the First German Whaling Company and renamed SS Sonderburg.

Sonderburg was scuttled by German troops in 1944 to block entrance to Cherbourg Harbour. In 1946 she was partially demolished to clear the shipway, with the final remains towed to the United Kingdom in 1947 to be scrapped.

References

Ocean liners
Ships built in Hamburg
Ships of the Holland America Line
Steamships
1899 ships
Ships of Swedish American Line